Joshua Sutor (born 26 October 1999) is a German curler from Pfronten, Germany. He currently is the alternate on the German National Men's Curling Team skipped by Sixten Totzek.

Career

Sutor played in three World Junior-B Curling Championships during his junior career in 2016, 2018 and 2019. He was the alternate for the Marc Muskatewitz rink in 2016, second for the Klaudius Harsch rink in 2018 and third for Sixten Totzek in 2019. After losing the qualifying game in 2016, his team won the bronze medal game at the 2018 World Junior B Curling Championships, sending them to the 2018 World Junior Curling Championships. At the championship, the team just missed the playoffs with a 4–5 record after losing their final round robin draw to Canada's Tyler Tardi. Their fifth-place finish earned the team a spot at the 2019 World Junior Curling Championships without having to qualify through the B Championship. They did not have a good performance at the 2019 championship, finishing with a 3–6 round robin record and being relegated to the B Championship for the following season. They would, however, qualify again through the 2019 World Junior-B Curling Championships in December 2019 to secure a spot at the 2020 World Junior Curling Championships. There, Sutor would have his best finish to date, qualifying for the playoffs for the first time with a 6–3 record. They then lost to Canada's Jacques Gauthier in the semifinal 7–4 and Scotland's James Craik in the bronze medal game 6–5, settling for fourth place.

Sutor competed in his first European Curling Championship in 2019 as second for the German team. There, his team finished with a 3–6 record. The team was set to represent Germany at the 2020 World Men's Curling Championship before the event was cancelled due to the COVID-19 pandemic.

Sutor remained as the German National Team's second for the 2020–21 season. They represented Germany at the 2021 World Men's Curling Championship in Calgary, Alberta where they finished with a 4–9 record.

Personal life
Sutor is a student.

Awards and honours
World Junior Curling Championships – Men's Sportsmanship Award 2019.

Teams

References

External links

1999 births
Living people
German male curlers
Sportspeople from Füssen
21st-century German people